The Legend of Calamity Jane is a 1997–1998 animated television series. The series followed the adventures of Calamity Jane in Deadwood, South Dakota. The episode "I'd Rather Be in Philadelphia" takes place during the opening of the Centennial Exposition, establishing the show as being set in 1876. The series had "fuller and richer animation than was customary on Saturday-morning TV."

It aired in France and Canada from 1997 to 1998 and in Portugal in 2002. It also aired on the POP TV channel in the UK from 2003-2004. Despite its short run the series developed a cult following.

Series run
In the United States, three episodes were aired on The WB in 1997. The network gave the series heavy promotion, but they quietly pulled it from their line-up after only three weeks. It was stated on Warner Bros.' website that the show would return later in the year, and that Superman: The Animated Series would be filling in for its timeslot, but this proved to be untrue. The series did run complete in Latin America and several European countries, and was dubbed into languages like French, Spanish, Portuguese, Italian, Swedish and Serbian.

Production
Jennifer Jason Leigh was originally cast as the voice of Calamity Jane. However, two weeks before the show was to premiere, the producers decided to re-cast the role. Barbara Scaff got the part. None of the dialogue recorded by Leigh was used in the final show. However, due to the short notice, the promotional ads aired on the WB used the lines by Leigh.

Main characters
 Calamity Jane – Although based on the historical frontierswoman, her appearance and background are fictionalized. For example, in the series she knows how to read and write and says she grew up in Portsmouth, Rhode Island and Atlanta, Georgia while the real Martha Jane Canary was illiterate and grew up in Missouri. She also claims to be a member of the Comanche tribe. She is depicted as a 24-year-old, green-eyed, pale-skinned redhead who fights on the side of "law and order". She prefers to use a whip and drink milk. She rides a black horse named Dakota. She is voiced by Barbara Scaff.
 Joe Presto – He serves as a helpful sidekick to Jane and shows great care and concern for her throughout the series. He prefers not to kill, as evidenced by his shotgun only being loaded with rock salt. He rides a mule named Tessy. He is voiced by Frank Welker.
  Wild Bill Hickok – Based on the real Wild Bill Hickok, he is depicted as an old friend of Jane's who helps her on several occasions despite his reservations toward the law. He is voiced by Clancy Brown.
 Quanna Parker – Jane's "blood brother" and Chief of the Comanche tribe. He likes existential philosophy. In "Troubled Waters" his tribe become millionaires thanks to finding oil on their land. He is voiced by Michael Horse.
 Captain John O'Rourke – He is a polite, by-the-book officer in the US cavalry who assists Jane throughout the series and is hinted to have romantic feelings for her. In "The Final Curtain" it is revealed he witnessed the Lincoln assassination as a child and felt responsible because his older brother, who should've been guarding the President, chose to sit by him instead. He is voiced by Tim Matheson.

Episodes

Home media
On October 3, 2022, Texas-based company - Comix.tv launched a Kickstarter campaign to fund a special DVD box set and special edition comic to celebrate the series’ 25th anniversary in 2022. The company previously did a Kickstarter campaign for a DVD release of Stone Protectors in 2021 which was successful. This campaign was successfully funded with $24,284 on 426 backers. On January 30, 2023, it was announced Discotek Media will release the series on Blu-ray.

References

External links

1997 American television series debuts
1998 American television series endings
1990s American animated television series
1990s French animated television series
American children's animated action television series
American children's animated adventure television series
Western (genre) animated television series
French children's animated action television series
French children's animated adventure television series
Kids' WB original shows
1990s Western (genre) television series
Television shows set in South Dakota
The WB original programming
Cultural depictions of Calamity Jane
Cultural depictions of Wild Bill Hickok